Carceda is one of 54 parishes in Cangas del Narcea, a municipality within the province and autonomous community of Asturias, in northern Spain.

Villages
 Carceda
 Castrusín
 Viescas
 Viḷḷaḷḷaz

Parishes in Cangas del Narcea